John Glyn Rowlands (7 February 1947 – 13 April 2020) was an English professional footballer who played as a defender and a forward. Active in England, South Africa and the United States, Rowlands made nearly 400 appearances in a 13-year career.

Career
Born in Liverpool, Rowlands began his career in non-league football with Marine and Skelmersdale United, before signing for Mansfield Town as an amateur in October 1967. He went on to play professionally in England, South Africa and the United States for Mansfield Town, Torquay United, Exeter City, Cape Town City, Stockport County, Barrow, Workington, Crewe Alexandra, the Seattle Sounders, Hartlepool United, the San Jose Earthquakes, the Oakland Stompers and the Tulsa Roughnecks.

In 1980 he was contracted to play with ASL expansion team the Phoenix Fire, but the team folded in pre-season.

Later life and death
After retirement, Rowlands moved to Florida and opened a number of bars and restaurants, before later returning to the UK.

He died on 13 April 2020, in Holyhead at the age of 73, from COVID-19.

References

1947 births
2020 deaths
English footballers
Marine F.C. players
Skelmersdale United F.C. players
Mansfield Town F.C. players
Torquay United F.C. players
Exeter City F.C. players
Cape Town City F.C. (NFL) players
Stockport County F.C. players
Barrow A.F.C. players
Workington A.F.C. players
Crewe Alexandra F.C. players
Seattle Sounders (1974–1983) players
Hartlepool United F.C. players
San Jose Earthquakes (1974–1988) players
Oakland Stompers players
Tulsa Roughnecks (1978–1984) players
English Football League players
North American Soccer League (1968–1984) players
Association football defenders
Association football forwards
English expatriate footballers
Expatriate soccer players in South Africa
Expatriate soccer players in the United States
English expatriate sportspeople in South Africa
English expatriate sportspeople in the United States
Deaths from the COVID-19 pandemic in Wales
Footballers from Liverpool
Phoenix Fire (soccer) players
National Football League (South Africa) players